Masashi Arikura (有倉 雅史, born June 12, 1967) is a Japanese former professional baseball pitcher. He played for the Nippon-Ham Fighters from 1990 to 1994, the Fukuoka Daiei Hawks in 1996 and 1997, and the Hanshin Tigers in 1998.

References

1967 births
Japanese baseball players
Living people
Nippon Professional Baseball pitchers
Nippon Ham Fighters players
Fukuoka Daiei Hawks players
Hanshin Tigers players